The 2002 United Nations Security Council election was held on 27 September 2002 at United Nations Headquarters in New York City during the 57th session of the United Nations General Assembly. The General Assembly elected five non-permanent members of the UN Security Council for two-year terms commencing on 1 January 2003.

The five candidates elected were Angola (for the first time), Chile, Germany, Pakistan, and Spain.

Geographic distribution
In accordance with the General Assembly's rules for the geographic distribution of the non-permanent members of the Security Council, and established practice, the members were to be elected as follows: one from Africa, one from Asia, one from Latin American and the Caribbean (GRULAC), and two from Western Europe and Other States.

Candidates
There was a total of five candidates for the five seats - none of the seats were contested. The candidates were: Angola for the African Group; Chile for the GRULAC region; Pakistan for the Asian Group, and Germany and Spain for the Western European and Others Group.

Results

Voting proceeded by secret ballot. For each geographic group, each member state could vote for as many candidates as were to be elected. There were 183 ballots in each of the three elections.

African and Asian States (two to be elected)
Angola 181
Pakistan 172
abstentions 1

Latin American and Caribbean States (one to be elected)
Chile 178
abstentions 5

Western European and Other States (two to be elected)
Germany 180
Spain 180

End Result
With all the five candidates running uncontested, and each of them achieving the requisite 2/3 support, the result of the election was as follows: Angola, Chile, Germany, Pakistan, and Spain were elected to the Security Council for two-year terms beginning on 1 January 2003.

See also
List of members of the United Nations Security Council
Germany and the United Nations
Pakistan and the United Nations
European Union and the United Nations

References
UN Document GA/10069 press release on the admittance of East Timor to the United Nations and the election
Southern Africa Documentation and Cooperation Centre

2002 elections
2002
2002 in international relations
Non-partisan elections
September 2002 events